Pierre van Ryneveld Park is a suburb of Centurion in Gauteng Province, South Africa. It is named after Sir Pierre van Ryneveld. It is bisected by the N1 freeway and is bordered by Pretoria's South Eastern suburbs Waterkloof Ridge, Elardus Park and Monument Park.

Geographic location

References

Suburbs of Centurion, Gauteng